Buescher State Park is a state park located just north of Smithville, Texas.

History

Between the years 1933 and 1936, Mr. Emil and Mrs. Elizabeth Buescher deeded  of land to the State of Texas. After Emil Buescher's death, his heirs donated  more. The rest of the parkland was acquired from the city of Smithville.

Companies 1805 and 1811 of the Civilian Conservation Corps built many of the park facilities between 1933 and 1939 using native stone to better blend with the surrounding landscape.

In 1967, the Texas Legislature transferred  to The University of Texas M. D. Anderson Cancer Center for use as a research facility, currently known as the Virginia Harris Cockrell Cancer Research Center at The University of Texas MD Anderson Cancer Center (Science Park).

In May 1957, Buescher State Park was selected to test a new type of low-cost overnight housing for park visitors.

The park is part of the Post Oak Savannah ecological region. A portion of its forest is in the Lost Pines ecosystem, the westernmost loblolly pines in the United States. A fire in 2015 burned most of the pines in this forest.

Features
The park features a  round trip hiking trail through the park's undeveloped area. There is also a small lake open for canoeing and fishing. The lake is stocked with crappie, catfish and bass year around and with rainbow trout in winter. Camping and picnicking areas are available.

Buescher is less than four miles (6 km) to the east of Bastrop State Park and the two are connected by Park Road 1.

Fauna
Over 250 species of birds have been spotted in the park throughout the year. Mammals include White-tailed deer, raccoons, opossums, bobcats, and armadillos.

See also
List of Texas state parks

References

External links 

Texas Parks and Wildlife - Buescher State Park
 
Information on the Civilian Conservation Corps work on Texas State Parks
University of Texas MD Anderson Science Park
1973 home movie of Buescher State Park from The Coltman Collection on the Texas Archive of the Moving Image

State parks of Texas
Protected areas of Bastrop County, Texas
Civilian Conservation Corps in Texas